Lee Mi-yeon (born September 23, 1971) is a South Korean actress.

Filmography

Film

Television series

Variety show

Music video

Theater

Discography

Awards and nominations

References

External links 
 
 
 

South Korean film actresses
South Korean television actresses
South Korean stage actresses
King Kong by Starship artists
1971 births
Living people
Dongguk University alumni
People from Seoul
Signal Entertainment Group artists
20th-century South Korean actresses
21st-century South Korean actresses